Deanna C. C. Peluso (born 1979) is an American-Canadian musician, composer, music educator, author and researcher currently residing in Honolulu, Hawaii and Vancouver, British Columbia.  Peluso combines her academic and experiential background in music, psychology, performance art, technology and education to fuel what is called a unique style of research that focuses on how youth engage in Participatory cultures, social media and artistic and musical learning.

Academic and professional work
Peluso is an alumna of Simon Fraser University with a doctorate PhD in Education from Simon Fraser University, and bachelor's degrees in both Music and in Psychology from Simon Fraser University.  Peluso also holds a Masters of Education in Educational and Organizational Leadership from the University of Victoria (UVIC), where her research on the motivations, benefits and persistence for mature students to pursue their graduate degrees led to her writing a book on her research and findings.

Research
Peluso is an active participant at international and local scholarly conferences in media, music and psychology, and her research focuses on various projects and foundations where an importance is placed on artistic and musical learning and expression within technological societies. Peluso's research has also dealt with the fields of Cognitive Psychology and Memory studies. Her most recent research has been focusing on Music Education and Media literacy, as seen in her 2010 talks at the Media Literacy Conference in London, UK, as well as her focus at RYME - Research For Youth, Music and Education.

Peluso's recent research has been featured on the Congress 2011 of Humanities and Social Sciences which is organized by the Canadian Federation for the Humanities and Social Sciences. An article on Peluso's research as a part of RYME discussed how the research group is bringing forth a new outlook on childhood education, the arts and the media. This article also recapped Peluso's and her colleagues' presentations at the Congress, and quoted Peluso as saying that "Teachers facilitate the role of exploring these [technological and artistic] opportunities, learn from kids and offer youth empowerment. Everyone has knowledge of what the next person doesn’t."

She has been cited as stating that "Digital mediums for communication, expression and multimodality engaging in one's own life, such as social media (e.g., Twitter) and interactive technology like iPads, enter the classroom in the pockets, bags and backpacks of many of the students and educators, yet only until recently have these digital media become a part of the educational environment. Curriculum designers and policy makers seem to be placing a focus on the role of technology within young people's lives"

Lectures and seminars
Peluso currently conducts educational research seminars and workshops on the Use of Technology within Academia and Educational Settings, Social Networking,  Icebreakers and Music within the Classroom. Peluso also lectures on technology within education and using technology and the Arts to engage in multimodal and intuitive forms of expression and communication. Peluso has also been involved in teaching music to adult learners and learners with disabilities, by using various techniques that focus on technology, music and other forms of artistic expression.

Peluso has recently been lecturing on the development of iOS applications for use within educational research, and provides seminars on implementing digital media within research and practice. Her work within the field of iOS App development has progress beyond uses for surveys and questionnaires and have now shown to involve developing complex social media based interactive Apps for the iPhone, iPad and iPod Touch that can reach an audience that includes young children and adults.

Workshops
Peluso's research into social media has led to her giving workshops on how to use social networks to advance one's career after graduate school. Her background in the positive and negative aspects of online communication allowed her to demonstrate various ways to build social networks in a way that can assist in moving from the life of a grad student to a working professional.

Graduate School and World of Warcraft Video Games
Peluso's focus on how participatory cultures can foster artistic and musical learning are influenced by her involvement in social media and [video] gaming. Through her experiences in graduate school and her involvement in the MMORPG World of Warcraft, she has developed parallels between the process of entering graduate school and the popular online role playing game. Her articles have been featured on the Simon Fraser University Dean of Graduate Studies website, where tips and tricks for graduate students are showcased.

Publications

Scholarly journals
Peluso's publication record in various peer-reviewed journals and academic publications includes articles on music education and the online environment, participatory cultures and the use of educational technology for artistic learning. In her co-authored article in the Canadian Music Educator, Peluso puts forth a set of standards for scholarly blogging.

Peluso's research on the use of iPads within educational applications was published in the July 2012 edition of the British Journal of Educational Technology. She emphasized the fact that the young people of today are requiring a new system of education to accommodate the technological ways that they are learning and communicating. Peluso is quoted as stating: 
While young people are engrossed with technology and social media within their everyday lives, using it to communicate, express themselves and learn in novel ways, simply allowing them to use their iPads, or providing them with classroom sets of iPods, does not implicitly mean they will be learning educationally beneficial material. I put forward that due to the intricate and fast-evolving ways that young people engage with these technologies, it may be in order to have an educational curriculum that is developed in collaboration with the young people themselves, that allows them to play an active role in discussing how they are learning.

Based on Peluso's publications in journals on educational technology, she has presented views on iOS technologies (e.g. iPads) and their role in young people's lives as being concurrent with the paradigms on participatory cultures as defined by Henry Jenkins. Further, Peluso is quoted in various venues in questioning how technology can be implemented in the classroom, in a way that is relevant and beneficial to the learners, rather than as a way to meet a curricular goal.

Music
Peluso has been involved in various musical and performance groups since 2000, though according to her website, due to health problems in late 2008 onward, she does not seem to be active in any particular musical group or organization.

Compositions
Peluso has been composing for over 20 years, but is best known for her performed works that occurred between 2000 and 2007 inclusive. Peluso has an eclectic collection of written compositions written during and after the years she studied music composition at Simon Fraser University. During her Music Composition degree, Peluso collaborated with dancers, filmmakers, actors and with other performing artists to fuel her experience in the field, in music education and to build upon her 14 years of studying and performing Classical period music. Former professors, mentors and teachers included Martin Gotfrit, David McIntyre, and Owen Underhill. Peluso has composed music for not just sole instrumental performance, but has been involved in composing music for dance, theatre and various other performing art installations within the Vancouver area. It seems that her music, artworks and online presence typically are signed under the pseudonym or nickname — dccp.

Selected works
2003-onward

Wave Rider - A Hui Ho, (Piano), Performed in Victoria, BC - March 2009
 Viaticus Una, Second Movement (Piece for Two Pianos) - February 2008
Viaticus Seorsum, First Movement (Piece for Two Pianos) - February 2008
Haunting Melody, (Piece for String Trio) - February 2007
Cordially Yours, (Piece for Cello and Piano), Victoria, B.C. - January 2007
From Cairo to Covilhã, (Piece for Solo Piano and Solo Dancer), November 2006
Cantata for a Cabaret Contortionist, (Piece for Accordion, Tenor and Dancer), October 2006
The Chill of An Early Morning by the Sea (Piece for Flute) - September 2006
Una Estudia de Portuguese, (Piece for Tenor Voice, Fiddle, Mandolin, Percussion, and Harmonica) - September 2006
The Music Box Circus, (Piece for Orchestra) Performed by the Vancouver Symphony Orchestra, The Orpheum Theatre, Vancouver, B.C. - April 2006
Sogno Dolce, (Piece for String Trio), Performed by the Infinitus String Quartet, Sonic Boom Festival, The Western Front, Vancouver, B.C. - March 2006
Tears Idle Tears, (Based on Tears, Idle Tears a poem by Lord Alfred Tennyson), (Piece for Men & Women's SATB Choir) Performed by the Phoenix Chamber Choir, Reading Session - 2005
I Do Not Love Thee, (Piece for Men & Women's SATB Choir) Performed by the Phoenix Chamber Choir, Reading Session - 2005
Capuchin Myth, (Piece for Clarinet, Trombone, Accordion & Percussion), Performed at the Sonic Boom Festival, The Western Front, Vancouver, B.C. - March 2005
Requitas Pacis, (Piece for Cello, Clarinet and Trombone) - March 2005
Requitas Quare, (Piece for Cello, Clarinet and Trombone) - March 2005
Ut Quaero Verum, (Piece for String Trio and Modern Dancer Improvisation in the style of Katherine Dunham) - March 2005
Vida Em Preto e Branco, Performed by Ensemble Symposium, Sonic Boom Festival, The Western Front, Vancouver, B.C. - March 2004
Tsunami, (Piece for Saxophone Quartet), Performed at the Sonic Boom Festival, The Western Front, Vancouver, B.C. - March 2003
Shallow Depth, (Piece for Saxophone Quartet), Performed at the Sonic Boom Festival, The Western Front, Vancouver, B.C. - March 2003

Performances of compositions
Peluso composed a piece for the Vancouver Symphony orchestra, The Music Box Circus, which was performed in 2006 during the Jean Coulthard Readings at the Orpheum Theatre. The Music Box Circus includes the entire orchestra in its orchestration, and is about 5 minutes 20 seconds in length.

The Sonic Boom Festival is an annual composers festival each spring located at the Western Front in Vancouver, B.C.  Peluso's compositions have had numerous performances at this Performing Arts festival that showcases various composers and musicians from across Canada. Peluso's compositions have varied from a string trio, a saxophone quartet, to eclectic mixes of accordion, cello and percussion.

Artistic performances and shows
Peluso has been a performer in various Performing Arts festivals and shows. She has performed music for independent film, dance accompaniment,  theatre performances and numerous collaboration projects involving the fine and performing arts.

Performances 
Peluso has been an active participant in the Arts community, both in solo performance and as a part of musical groups or collaborations with theatre, dance or film.  During 2003, Peluso performed in the House Performing Arts Festival, as a musician for the theatre group "Un/Stuck", which featured actors from the Greater Vancouver Regional District. In 2003, with the same theatre troupe she performed at Nextfest 2004, the Performing Arts Festival in Edmonton, Alberta.

In 2005, among her schedule of musical performances as a part of dance and performance art shows, she performed with Gamelan Alligator Joy, a performance group that plays a combination of traditional and contemporary Javanese Gamelan. Peluso performed with the same performance group at various other events around Vancouver, B.C. throughout 2005 and 2006.

References

Canadian composers
Academic staff of Simon Fraser University
Simon Fraser University alumni
1982 births
Living people
Canadian non-fiction writers
Musicians from Vancouver
Writers from Vancouver
Canadian women non-fiction writers
Canadian music educators
Women music educators
Canadian women composers